Arnold "Noldi" Gartmann (20 November 1904 – 4 June 1980) was a Swiss bobsledder who competed in the late 1930s. He won a gold medal in the four-man event at the 1936 Winter Olympics in Garmisch-Partenkirchen.

Gartmann also won a silver medal in the four-man event at the 1935 FIBT World Championships in St. Moritz.

References
Bobsleigh four-man Olympic medalists for 1924, 1932-56, and since 1964
Bobsleigh four-man world championship medalists since 1930
DatabaseOlympics.com profile

1904 births
1980 deaths
Swiss male bobsledders
Olympic bobsledders of Switzerland
Bobsledders at the 1936 Winter Olympics
Olympic gold medalists for Switzerland
Olympic medalists in bobsleigh
Medalists at the 1936 Winter Olympics
20th-century Swiss people